The U.S. Post Office and Courthouse in Albany, Georgia is a three-story building that was built during 1910–1912.  Its architecture style is primarily Second Renaissance Revival architecture and is credited to U.S. Supervising Architect James Knox Taylor.  It is perhaps one of Knox's last designed works;  he retired as Supervising Architect in 1912.

It served historically as a courthouse and as a post office.  It was listed on the National Register of Historic Places in 1979.

See also 
List of United States post offices

References 

Courthouses on the National Register of Historic Places in Georgia (U.S. state)
Post office buildings on the National Register of Historic Places in Georgia (U.S. state)
Government buildings completed in 1912
Buildings and structures in Albany, Georgia
Renaissance Revival architecture in Georgia (U.S. state)
Courthouses in Georgia (U.S. state)
Post office buildings in Georgia (U.S. state)
National Register of Historic Places in Dougherty County, Georgia
1912 establishments in Georgia (U.S. state)